Bouchra Chaabi (born 22 September 1980 in Bougargouh) is a Moroccan long-distance runner who specializes in the 3000 metres steeplechase.

She made her Olympic debut at the 2000 Sydney Olympics, running in the 10,000 metres. That year she had been the bronze medallist in the event at the 2000 African Championships in Athletics. She made the top twenty in the short race at every IAAF World Cross Country Championships from 2002 to 2006. She also began to compete in the 3000 metres steeplechase and became continental champion with a gold medal victory at the 2004 African Championships in Athletics.

She won the Eurocross cross country running competition in 2004. Chaâbi went on to win a 5000 metres bronze medal at the 2004 Pan Arab Games later that year. She switched to the 3000 m steeplechase for the 2005 World Championships in Athletics and managed to finish tenth in the event final. That year, she was the 5000 m silver medallist at the 2005 Jeux de la Francophonie behind compatriot Zhor El Kamch. She took the steeplechase bronze medal at the 2006 African Championships in Athletics. She ran the 1500 metres at the 2007 World Championships in Athletics but was eliminated in the heats. She competed over the same distance for Morocco at the 2008 Summer Olympics, but did not progress past the first round yet again.

Her 2009 season was highlighted by a 5000 m gold medal and 10,000 m silver at the Jeux de la Francophonie. She managed second place at the 2010 Cross de la Constitución in December, finishing behind Mónica Rosa.

Achievements

Personal bests
1500 metres - 4:03.62 min (2007)
3000 metres - 8:48.00 min (2006)
5000 metres - 15:21.32 min (2004)
10,000 metres - 32:17.7 min (2000)
Half marathon - 1:17:45 hrs (2003)
3000 metres steeplechase - 9:30.35 min (2004)

References

External links



1980 births
Living people
Moroccan female steeplechase runners
Moroccan female long-distance runners
Moroccan female middle-distance runners
Olympic athletes of Morocco
Athletes (track and field) at the 2000 Summer Olympics
Athletes (track and field) at the 2008 Summer Olympics
World Athletics Championships athletes for Morocco
20th-century Moroccan women
21st-century Moroccan women